Ards RFC (Ards Rugby Football Club) is a rugby club based in Newtownards, County Down, Northern Ireland, playing in the Ulster Rugby Championship Division 2. It is affiliated to the Ulster Branch of the Irish Rugby Football Union. The club currently fields three adult teams and a women's team, North Down Women, who are a combination of players from Ards, Bangor and Donaghadee. Three youth teams also play at under-18, under-16 and under-14 levels. There is also a rapidly developing girls' junior section and a very successful mini rugby section in the club. The club works in close collaboration with local schools such as Regent House Grammar School, Movilla High School and Strangford College who provide much of the playing talent at the club.

Foundation

On 11 April 1928, Ards Rugby Football Club was formed at a meeting in Newtownards Academy pavilion. The first competitive game was played on 13 October 1928. Ards RFC played most of their early years in the Ulster Junior Leagues.

Senior Status

In the 1961-62 season Ards won the Towns Cup for the first time captained by Bobby Haslett. In 1977-1978 season Ards achieved senior status when they gained promotion to the Ulster Senior League by defeating Ballymena 2nd XV 12-6 in an Ulster League Section 2 playoff at Shane Park, Instonians. After a downturn in fortunes in the 1990s Ards were relegated from senior rugby in season 2000-2001 to Qualifying League Section 1. However, in the 2002-2003 season Ards won the AIB All Ireland Qualifying Round Robin playoff and were promoted for a second time to the All-Ireland League. In 2015 Ards were relegated from the All-Ireland League and now play in the Ulster Rugby Championship Division 2.

Honours
Boston Floodlit Cup, Bangor: 1
1976-77
Ulster Senior Cup: 2
 1984-85, 1986–87
Ulster Senior League: 1
 1983-84
Ulster Towns Cup: 2
 1961-62, 2002–03
Ulster Junior Cup: 1
 1976-77

Notable Former Players

Internationals
 British and Irish Lions
 
 

 
 Scott Robertson Dave Dillon

https://www.pitchero.com/clubs/ards/a/history-8456.html?page=5

External Links
Ards RFC website

Rugby union clubs in Northern Ireland
Irish rugby union teams
Rugby clubs established in 1928
Newtownards
Rugby union clubs in County Down